Thorpe Park Resort, commonly known as Thorpe Park, is an amusement park located in the village of Thorpe between the towns of Chertsey and Staines-upon-Thames in Surrey, England,  southwest of Central London. It is operated by Merlin Entertainments and includes rides, themed cabins, live events and Stealth, the United Kingdom's fastest rollercoaster. In 2019 Thorpe park was the UK's third most visited theme park (1.9 million visitors), behind Alton Towers and Legoland Windsor. However, in 2020, due to the coronavirus pandemic, the park only had a 125-day operation season, along with limited capacity, leading to massively reduced visitor numbers. Despite this, Thorpe Park was the second most attended theme park in the UK in 2020, behind Alton Towers.

After demolition of the Thorpe Park Estate in the 1930s, the site became a gravel pit managed by Ready Mix Concrete (RMC). When the pits were expended, RMC regenerated the site for leisure, opening Thorpe Park as an outdoor activity park in 1979. It has since grown into one of the major theme parks in the UK.

Major attractions include Tidal Wave, a large water ride, a number of rollercoasters including Colossus, Nemesis Inferno, Stealth, Saw – The Ride, The Swarm, The Walking Dead: The Ride, and Ghost Train, a dark ride.

History

The demolition of the Thorpe Park Estate in the 1930s saw the grounds transform into a gravel pit, originally owned by Ready Mixed Concrete Limited. When the pits were expended, RMC flooded part of the site. In 1975 the Water Ski World Championships were held on the site. RMC established a subsidiary, Leisure Sport Limited, to operate a  park for water sports, leisure and heritage exhibitions, at a cost of £3 million.

The park was officially opened to the public by Lord Louis Mountbatten on 24 May 1979, his final public appearance shortly before he was assassinated by a bomb on board in a fishing boat planted by the Provisional IRA in Mullaghmore, Ireland. In addition to lakes and parkland, the park featured a replica Stone Age cave, Celtic farm, Norman castle and Viking camp as well as ancient water vehicles and aircraft.

Between 1983 and 1989 it was regularly used as a filming location for The Benny Hill Show.

In the early 80s, the park redeveloped into a theme park with permanent themed rides and attractions. New attractions were opened throughout the 1980s and 1990s. Space Station Zero was the park's first rollercoaster, opening in 1984. The last large attraction opened by the park's original owners was "X:\No Way Out" in 1996.

In 1998, The Tussauds Group bought the park. From the outset the park started opening key attractions such as Tidal Wave in 2000, Colossus in 2002, Nemesis Inferno in 2003 and Stealth in 2006.

In May 2007, Blackstone Group purchased The Tussauds Group for US$1.9 billion and the company was merged into Merlin Entertainments, who took over operation of Thorpe Park. Dubai International Capital also gained 20% of Merlin Entertainments.

On 17 July 2007, as part of the financing for the Tussauds deal, Merlin sold Thorpe Park to private investor Nick Leslau and his investment firm Prestbury, under a sale and leaseback agreement. Although it is owned by Prestbury, the site is operated by Merlin based on a renewable 35-year lease.

The target audience for the resort is teenagers and young adults, adding rides such as Saw – The Ride and The Swarm for example. In 2014, Merlin decided to also target a more broad-family based market with new attractions such as Angry Birds Land and the park's onsite hotel.

On 20 February 2019, the official Twitter account of Thorpe Park confirmed the permanent closure of Logger's Leap, a log flume that opened in 1989 but had been closed since 2015.

In 2021, Thorpe park announced plans for a new rollercoaster in the Old Town section of the park, planned to open for the 2024 season, under the project name of Project Exodus. This ride is set to be the tallest ride in the UK, at a height of 236 feet (71.93 metres).

Rides and attractions

Rollercoasters

Thrilling flat rides

Water rides

Family flat rides

Dark rides and other rides

Attractions under construction

Former attractions

Territories 
Since 2016, Thorpe Park is zoned into eight 'island territories'. 

 Port and Basecamp includes the turnstile entrance, bridge, the dome and the playground.
 Amity (originally 'Amity Cove') opened with Tidal Wave and now includes Stealth, Depth Charge, Amity Beach, High Strikers & Storm Surge.
 The Jungle contains Nemesis Inferno, Rumba Rapids, Mr Monkey's Banana Ride and a street of restaurants.
 Angry Birds Land is in partnership with the Angry Birds video game. Attractions in this area include Angry Birds 4D, Detonator: Bombs Away and King Pig's Wild Hog Dodgems.
 Old Town is located towards the back of the park and includes Saw - The Ride & Black Mirror Labyrinth
 Lost City contains Colossus, Rush, Quantum, Vortex and Zodiac.
 Swarm Island opened as the plaza for The Swarm.
 The Dock Yard (previously named 'The Depot' and 'Thorpe Junction') is the plaza immediately outside Ghost Train, previously known as "Derren Brown's Ghost Train" and includes the nearby The Walking Dead: The Ride rollercoaster, previously known as "X" and "X:\ No way out".

Port and Basecamp
The 'Basecamp' area contains security, the turnstiles, toilets, business/staff reception, 'Island HQ' and bridge where guests enter the park. This leads to 'The Dome' which acts as a hub for the park, which houses 'Vibes Bar & Kitchen' (formerly Infinity Bar & Kitchen), an arcade area, The Coffee Shack, toilets, lockers, the Island Gift Shop, guest services, first aid, photo points and staff areas (canteen, 'The Core' and offices).

The dome was previously known as 'Port Atlantis' with an underwater Atlantian themed interior. Much of the scenery and underwater effects went missing since Merlin's acquisition of the park and was removed altogether after the building's change of theme.

The Dome remains open outside park operating hours to provide entertainment and dining facilities for guests staying at Thorpe Shark Cabins, including a breakfast buffet.

Amity
Amity is set as a 1950s-era American fishing village hit by a tidal wave and opened with Tidal Wave in 2000. It was previously named 'Amity Cove', as still named on themed signage. The area was expanded in 2006 with Stealth, set at 'Amity Speedway' racetrack. It later took on attractions from the former 'Neptune's Beach' family area, Depth Charge, and Amity Beach outdoor water park. Amity and Amity Speedway are no longer physically connected, being divided by Angry Birds Land.

It also includes attractions from the former 'European Park' area, Flying Fish and Storm In A Teacup. Flying Fish was originally located beside Tidal Wave (where Stealth sits today) but was removed following construction of Stealth in 2005. It was reopened, in its present location near The Swarm, in 2007, due to popular demand. In 2011, the raft water ride Storm Surge was re-located from Cypress Gardens in Florida, USA, before it was rethemed into Legoland Florida. Storm Surge was built on the former site of the Octopus Garden children's area.

The Jungle 
The area's main attractions are Nemesis Inferno, a Bolliger & Mabillard inverted coaster set in a volcano, and Rumba Rapids a river rapids ride. The area was previously named 'Calypso Quay', the area now also includes part of the former 'Ranger County' family area, including Mr Monkey's Banana Ride a small swinging ship ride, as well as shopfronts and restaurants from the former 'European Park' area.

In 2021, Trailers, a Fright Nights maze, opened in the building formerly housing the I'm a Celebrity... attraction.

Angry Birds Land 
Angry Birds Land opened in May 2014 and is themed to the Angry Birds media franchise.  Attractions include Angry Birds 4D (a 4D cinema), King Pig's Wild Hog Dodgems (dodgems), and Detonator (a drop tower ride).

The Dock Yard 
This area is primarily the plaza for Ghost Train, an indoor dark ride, and also contains The Walking Dead: The Ride an indoor rollercoaster. The area has no major themed features, other than buildings and scenery remaining from 'Octopus's Garden' (a since-closed children's area) which was later themed to Amity such as the Megastore, various buoys, and a carnival game that resembles a cargo ship.

Lost City 
The Lost City's theme is that of the ruins of a recently unearthed Atlantean civilisation, with Colossus as the main attraction (since 2002). The area first opened in 2001 with the Vortex and Zodiac rides as the only attractions. In 2003, this area was expanded further, with the additions of Quantum (a magic carpet ride) and Eclipse (a Ferris Wheel). Eclipse was removed after the 2004 season (being relocated to Chessington World of Adventures); in its place, Rush, an S&S Screamin' Swing, was opened in the 2005 season. At the end of the 2005 season, Zodiac was removed, and replaced with a new HUSS Enterprise (relocated from Drayton Manor, where it operated under the name Cyclone, until it had to be closed down due to noise complaints). The replacement Zodiac opened (without fanfare) for the 2006 season.

Old Town 
The ride is themed to the Saw horror movie franchise and is set in a derelict warehouse/sawmill. A flat ride called Samurai was relocated from Chessington World of Adventures in 2004. The area is also home to the brand new 2021 experience Black Mirror Labyrinth and will be home to the planned "Project Exodus" hyper coaster. Old Town also includes a Burger King.

The area was previously named 'Canada Creek' and was the plaza for Logger's Leap, which opened in 1989 as one of the tallest log flumes in the world. It had a loose Canadian forest theme, although this has mostly been lost through redevelopments and resembles more of a Western town theme. The main attractions listed in the area sat outside the plaza. Logger's Leap ceased to operate after the 2015 season, and its permanent closure was confirmed in 2019. It also used to have the main station for the Canada Creek Railway, a miniature railway which used to take guests to and from the (now closed) 'Thorpe Farm' area of the park, and around the backwoods of Canada Creek (after the closure of Thorpe Farm, it only traversed the backwoods of the Canada Creek area). The railway was closed during the 2008 season (and the track had to be partially rerouted due to the construction of SAW - The Ride), before being closed permanently at the end of the 2011 season. In the years since its closure, the trains, station, and route used by this ride were utilized by several Fright Nights attractions.

Most of the rides in this area have been closed since the start of the 2022 season, due to construction work for Project Exodus.

Swarm Island 
Swarm Island is the plaza area for The Swarm, a Bolliger & Mabillard wing-rider rollercoaster, opened in 2012. The area was built on land reclaimed from the surrounding lakes. The area is themed as the scene of an apocalyptic disaster/alien invasion with a crashed plane, various damaged emergency vehicles like a helicopter and fire truck, a partially destroyed church (used as the ride station), and other destroyed structures. Many of the areas facilities are based within these structures, such as the ride station being housed in the church, the shop being housed in a shipping container, and the ride control room being based in an overturned police trailer wedged in the roof of the church.

Records held by the park

 Nemesis Inferno is the first inverted coaster to feature interlocking corkscrews.
 Additionally, the world record for 'most naked people on a rollercoaster' was set on Nemesis Inferno in May 2004.
 The Swarm opened as Europe's tallest wing coaster.
 SAW - The Ride was marketed as having the world's steepest 'freefall' drop, and as the world's first horror movie themed roller coaster. SAW - The Ride was not actually the steepest rollercoaster in the world when it opened in March 2009 - Steel Hawg at Indiana Beach had opened the previous year with a steeper 111° drop. However, whilst Steel Hawg's drop has brakes on it, SAW'''s drop is brakeless - hence it being marketed as having the steepest freefall drop. This particular accolade was taken by The Monster in 2016 (and, as of 2022, is held by Defiance).Colossus held the world record for the most inversions on a rollercoaster when it opened in 2002, with 10 inversions.

Events

Thorpe Park events for the 2023 Season:

 Mardi Gras (18 May – 11 June) which will entail "a variety of live entertainment" as it brings "a taste of New Orleans" to the park.
 Carnival (21 July – 28 August) where live entertainment and a brand new stage show will be arriving to the park for a limited time.
 Oktoberfest (8 September – 1 October) which the park offers live entertainment (music and roaming actors) at the Island Festival Centre (By Derren Brown's Ghost Train) and German food and drink offerings around the park. Rides and attractions are open until late and select rides have Bavarian themed music/ride announcements to fit with the Oktoberfest theme.
 Fright Nights (6 October – 31 October) which the park offers a range of Halloween entertainment: including horror mazes, shows, scare zones and roaming actors. On top of this, rides and attractions are open until late – excluding  Depth Charge (close at dusk).

In recent years, Thorpe Park has held a range of unique events such as Zombie Hunt (2018), GameFX (2019), ParkVibes (2021) and many more.

Fright NightsFright Nights, formerly "Fright Nites" is Thorpe Park's annual Halloween event and also its largest Halloween event in the UK. It is an event that has been running at Thorpe Park since 2002, celebrating Halloween with the park staying open until late at night, as well as operating a range of temporary Halloween attractions. Roaming actors in costume or with make up can also be found around the park. During Fright Nights, the park stays open until 9pm, with a range of "scare mazes" available for guests, who normally enter in groups of 8–10. "Face it Alone" has sometimes been available as an upcharge, where a guest enters unaccompanied and must sign a disclaimer before entering.

In 2013, Fright Nights was relaunched with a horror movie theme, courtesy of a three-year contract with Lionsgate. All of the pre-existing Fright Nights attractions were removed with the exception of The Asylum and SAW: Alive to make way for new horror-film themed attractions.

In 2014, when the Thorpe Shark Hotel opened, Thorpe Park offered two overnight scare attractions, one of which involved a 'night terror' character appearing in guests' hotel rooms during the night. The other attraction, the 'Extra Cut', involved guests being 'kidnapped' from their hotel room during the night and chased throughout the park.

In 2017 Fright Nights was reinvented with a Walking Dead theme. The addition of two Walking Dead attractions coincided with the season 8 premier of the show. SAW Alive, The Big Top and Platform 15 remained in operation from previous years, with Containment returning as an upcharge attraction.

In 2020, restrictions put into place due to the COVID-19 Pandemic meant that only two mazes operated: Platform 15 and Roots of Evil, both of which took place primarily outdoors. This led to a wide selection of scare zones introduced for the first time to Fright Nights, with The Swarm: Invasion located on Swarm Island, Creek Freaks Unchained in Old Town, The Fearstival Arena in The Dockyard, The Howling of LycanThorpe High in Lost City (on the site near Zodiac and Rush typically used for a scare maze), and Terror at Amity High returning for its third year on the Stealth Plaza. The Crows were also added as roaming actors dressed as scarecrows, based in a few main locations but found anywhere around the park, including interacting with other scare zones.

 – Previous Fright Night attraction.
 – Current Fright Night attraction.

Hotel

Guests can stay over on-park at the 'Thorpe Shark Cabins', comprising 90 rooms converted from shipping containers with a link to facilities in the adjacent Dome. The accommodation takes its name from its shark head entrance feature built from recycled park signage.

The hotel initially opened in 2013 as 'The Crash Pad', run by external company Snoozebox. The temporary development was purchased by the park the following year and rebranded as the Thorpe Shark Hotel.

Thorpe Park had originally been planning to build a permanent 250-bed hotel as far back as 2006. This would have been located on the opposite side of the lake, on the site of former excavation works, featuring a lakeside bar, health club and restaurant. Planning permission was granted in 2011.

The development was pitched again following the installation of 'The Crash Pad' to "test market conditions". The park received planning permission to construct the permanent hotel in 2014, with construction planned to begin in 2016 and an opening in 2018. However, the hotel was never constructed and the Shark Hotel's planning permission was extended by 10 years instead.

 Operations and developments 
Thorpe Park has a maximum capacity of 15,000 guests.Theme Parks Operation in Chertsey – Scoot. Retrieved 16 November 2021.

In 2010, the park outlined a 5-year development plan that outlined new rollercoasters for 2012, which was later realised in The Swarm. The plan outlined another rollercoaster scheduled for 2015 as well as a permanent lakeside hotel, both of which have not come to fruition. No application was ever submitted for the 2015 development and the earmarked site behind The Swarm remains undeveloped.

On 26 November 2021, the park launched a public consultation website outlining a proposal for a brand new roller coaster. Alongside this, leaflets were handed out to local residents, stating the proposal will 'involve the removal of existing old rides and replacement with a new roller coaster in the Old Town part of the resort'. An application for planning permission was submitted on the 14th of March 2022.

Objections to the planning permission application were raised by Surrey Wildlife Trust, Natural England, and the Environment Agency; citing concerns regarding biodiversity impacts, pollution, and flood risks. The concerns raised by Surrey Wildlife Trust and Natural England were addressed, leading to their objections subsequently being withdrawn, however, the Environment Agency's concerns remained unresolved as of October 2022. On the 5th of October 2022, Runnymede Borough Council approved the application for "Project Exodus", but, due to the unresolved objection from the Environment Agency, the application had to be referred to the Secretary of State for Levelling Up, Housing and Communities for approval (under the terms of The Town and Country Planning (Consultation) (England) Direction 2021).   

On the 1st of November 2022, a letter sent to Runnymede Borough Council on behalf of the Secretary of State for Levelling Up, Housing and Communities stated that 'He is content that it should be determined by the local planning authority'. Subsequently, Runnymede Borough Council granted planning permission for "Project Exodus" on the 2nd of November 2022.

Incidents

See also

 Merlin Entertainments
 The Tussauds Group
 RMC Group
 "Thorpe Park", an episode of The Inbetweeners where the main characters visit Thorpe Park
 Primeval'' – the third episode of Series 2 featured the park under a fictitious name.
 Staines railway station
 Alton Towers
 Chessington World of Adventures
 Theme Park
Drayton Manor Theme Park

References

External links

 
 Merlin Entertainments
 Official Fan Website
 Memories of Thorpe Park

 
1979 establishments in England
Amusement parks in England
Buildings and structures in Surrey
Merlin Entertainments Group
Tourist attractions in Surrey
Amusement parks opened in 1979
Parks and attractions with Angry Birds exhibits